Olga Yuriyivna Ianchuk (born 29 March 1995) is a Ukrainian former professional tennis player.

Career
Ianchuk has career-high WTA rankings of 213 in singles, achieved in August 2017, and 254 in doubles, reached in October 2015. In her career, she won eleven singles and four doubles titles on tournaments of the ITF Circuit.

Ianchuk made her WTA Tour main-draw debut at the 2015 Baku Cup in the doubles event, partnering Oleksandra Korashvili.

Her older sister Elizaveta Ianchuk is also a professional tennis player.

ITF Circuit finals

Singles: 17 (11 titles, 6 runner-ups)

Doubles: 21 (4 titles, 17 runner-ups)

External links
 
 

Ukrainian female tennis players
1995 births
Living people
Sportspeople from Kyiv
21st-century Ukrainian women